Hillside Football Club is an Australian rules football club, formerly Sydenham Hillside Football Club, in Victoria, Australia.  It may also refer to:
 Hillside Football Club (South Australia), former name of the McLaren Flat Football Club in South Australia, Australia